Chanidapa Pongsilpipat, (born July 15, 1988) in Thailand, is a Thai actress, model and presenter. She is best known for her role in the 2007 film, The Love of Siam as Donut. Now she is with Channel 3 and has starred in many TV series with the TV channel since 2013. Her nickname is Best. Her other nickname known by Chinese fans is Xiaobu.

Biography
Best's original name was Aticha Pongsilpipat. She entered entertainment business after winning a skin competition by Babi Mild. She then has many fashion shots with various woman and fashion magazines, TV commercials, music videos before moving to films and TV series.

In her first film, The Love of Siam (Kak Haeng Siam, รักแห่งสยาม), she appeared as one of the four main actors promoted on the film's poster. She starred as "Donut", girlfriend of "Tong", one of the two leading actors. The film won many Thailand film awards for movie showing in the year 2005.

She then signed with Exact, the television arm of GMM Grammy, during 2007—2012 and starred in several of Exact TV series (lakorn) aired on Channel 5. She changed her name to Chanidapa in this period. When the contract expired, she refused to renew contract with Exact, citing the desired to be able to freely accepting various works including advertisements and events since she had already graduated and became available 7 days a week.

She went on to become a freelance actress, starred in a Channel 9 drama "Sao Noi", and Channel 3 drama "Phu Dee Isan" which is her first villain role. She then had comedy-villain role in her next Channel 3 drama "Ruen Ritsaya". After a few TV series with Channel 3, she then signed acting contract with the channel mid-2014.

Education 
 Bachelor's Degree: Faculty of Fine Art, Srinakharinwirot University (Acting and Directing Major)

Filmography

TV Series / Lakorn

Awards and nominations
 Milky Girl (Babi mild)
 Vita Girl (Vita)
 Miss Fresh (Ac’cess)
 Press Lover (Vivite)

Other appearances
 Stage Play The Star Spangled-girl (พราวตา) Year : 2010

Advertisements
Commercial
 CAMELLA
 TARO V-plus
 Magic Talker’s
 M BIKE
 TT&T

Magazine 
 Cleo Magazine
 Spicy Magazine
 Sweety Magazine
 Rush Magazine
 Hug Magazine
 MIX Magazine
 ISEE Magazine

References

External links
 Fanpage
 Channel
 Twitter
 Instagram
 Hi5
 Aticha Pongsilpipat (old name) at the Internet Movie Database

Chanidapa Pongsilpipat
Chanidapa Pongsilpipat
Chanidapa Pongsilpipat
1988 births
Living people
Chanidapa Pongsilpipat
Chanidapa Pongsilpipat